The Dardaim or Dor Daim, are adherents of the Dor Deah movement in Orthodox Judaism .  (Hebrew: "generation of knowledge", an allusion to the Israelites who witnessed the Exodus.)  That movement took its name in 1912 in Yemen under Rabbi Yiḥyah Qafiḥ, and had its own network of synagogues and schools, although, in actuality, the movement existed long before that name had been coined for it. According to ethnographer and historian, Shelomo Dov Goitein, author and historiographer, Hayyim Habshush had been a member of this movement before it had been given the name Dor Deah, writing, “...He (i.e. Hayyim Habshush) and his friends, partly under European influence, but driven mainly by developments among the Yemenite Jews themselves, formed a group who ardently opposed all those forces of mysticism, superstition and fatalism which were then so prevalent in the country and strove for exact knowledge and independent thought, and the application of both to life.” It was only some years later, when Rabbi Yihya Qafih became the headmaster of the new Jewish school in Sana'a built by the Ottoman Turks and where he wanted to introduce a new curriculum in the school whereby boys would also learn arithmetic and the rudiments of the Arabic and Turkish languages that Rabbi Yihya Yitzhak Halevi gave to Rabbi Qafih's movement the name Daradʻah, a word which is an Arabic broken plural made-up of the Hebrew words Dör Deʻoh, and which means "Generation of Knowledge."

Its objects were:
to combat the influence of the Zohar and subsequent developments in modern Kabbalah, which were then pervasive in Yemenite Jewish life, and which the Dor Daim believed to be irrational and idolatrous;
 to restore what they believed to be a rational approach to Judaism rooted in authentic sources, including the Talmud, Saadia Gaon and especially Maimonides;
to safeguard the older (Baladi) tradition of Yemenite Jewish observance, which they believed to be based on this approach.

Today there is no official Dor Dai movement, but the term is used for individuals and synagogues within the Yemenite community (mostly in Israel) who share the original movement's perspectives.  There are also some groups, both within and outside the Yemenite community, holding a somewhat similar stance, who describe themselves as talmide ha-Rambam (disciples of Maimonides) rather than Dor Daim.

History

Background: Baladi and Shami rituals

Since the early Middle Ages the Yemenite Jewish community followed the teachings of Maimonides on almost all legal issues, and their prayer book was substantially identical to the text set out in his "Sefer Ahavah". This is attested by the writings of several well known Rabbis such as Nahmanides, Obadiah of Bertinoro and the Maharitz. The Yemenite tradition is therefore separate from both the Sephardi and the Ashkenazi streams in Judaism.

In the 16th and 17th centuries the teachings of the Kabbalah, especially in the form advocated by Isaac Luria and his school, became increasingly popular in Yemen as in other countries. This did not always mean a change in the liturgy; Luria himself held that it was essential to keep to the form of prayers inherited from one's ancestors, so that one's prayers reached the gate in Heaven appropriate to one's tribe. However, many individuals and communities around the world (principally Mizrahi Jews but also Ḥasidim) discarded their ancestral rites in favor of the modified Sephardic rite used by Luria and his immediate circle, on the reasoning that this form of prayer reached a "thirteenth gate" for those who did not know their tribe.

This division would be reflected among the Yemenite Jews. The Shami sub-group adopted a Sephardic-influenced rite, in no small part due to its essentially being forced upon them. Others retained the Yemenite ancestral liturgy, whether or not they accepted the Zoharic/Lurianic Kabbalah theologically. In the 18th century, to ensure the continued use of the Yemenite's original text, Rabbi Yiḥyah Salaḥ (known as the Maharitz) promoted compromise and introduced a new edition of the Yemenite Jewish prayer book which he created. It substantially followed the traditional Yemenite (Maimonidean) ritual, but made some concessions to the Kabbalists, for example by incorporating the hymn Lechah Dodi. This new standard became known as Baladi (meaning "of the country", i.e. Yemen), in contrast to the adopted Lurianic-Sephardic ritual which was known as Shami (literally "northern", meaning Palestinian or Damascene). The distinction also affected questions of Jewish law, the Baladi community continued to follow Maimonides almost exclusively while the Shami community also accepted the Shulchan Aruch.

In the 18th century, Yemen produced an influential Kabbalist in Shalom Sharabi, who headed the Beit El Synagogue in Jerusalem, the elite seclusion centre for developing and praying in the Lurianic system. Over time more and more Kabbalistic practices became popular among the Yemenite Jews to the point that the Baladi community became localized as a significant population only around the area of Yemen's capital city, Sana'a. Today, as the majority of Yemenite Jewry are outside of Yemen and in closer contact with Ashkenazi and Sephardi Jews, it could be perceived that the proportion with which the Dor Daim perspective is spreading (though in a different form than the original) is not much different from the rate at which Yemenite Jews as a whole are giving up their unique traditions and assimilating into mainstream Judaism.

Formation of movement

Dor Daim emerged as a recognizable force in the later part of the 19th century.  The Dor Daim movement was formed by individuals who were displeased by the influence of Kabbalah which had been introduced to Yemen in the 17th century. They believed that the core beliefs of Judaism were rapidly diminishing in favor of the mysticism of the Kabbalah. Displeased by the direction that education and the social development of Yemen was taking, they opened their own educational system in Yemen (see Dor Daim and Iqshim). They were also unhappy with the influence that Kabbalists (mystics) were having on various customs and rituals (e.g. the text of the prayer book), in addition to a strong superstitious influence which they saw as contrary to Maimonides. For example, Rabbi Yosef Qafeh relates one of many Yemenite customs for "חינוך הבית" whereby they would bake plain bread without salt and prepare "the table of appeasement." Inviting more than 10 children aged seven or eight who waited outside, they set the table, scattering thin-ash upon it; crumbled the plain bread into bits, placing them upon the table holding the ashes; and exited the kitchen stating, to the demons (Hebrew: שדים), "this is your portion." Shortly thereafter they would abruptly open its doors, whereupon the children burst in, grabbing the saltless pieces and eating them. Rabbi Yiḥyah Qafeh sharply opposed these minhagim, being of the opinion that, in addition to the stupidity of the matter, they are Biblically forbidden because of darchei haEmori.

The Dor Daim considered the Kabbalists to be irrational in attitude and felt that they were thereby contributing to a decline in the social and economic status of the Yemenite Jews. The above-mentioned issues led Rabbi Yiḥyah Qafiḥ to spearhead the Dor Daim movement. Among its goals was the revival and protection of what it saw as the original form of Judaism as codified by the Sanhedrin during the 1st through 3rd centuries.

The movement was not well received by some scholars in Yemen and Israel. Especially controversial were the views of the Dor Daim on the most popularized book of Kabbalah known as the Zohar. These views are put forth in a book called Milhamoth HaShem (Wars of the Lord).  A group of Jerusalem rabbis published an attack on Rabbi Qafiḥ under the title of Emunat Hashem (Faith of the Lord), taking measures to ostracize members of the movement; notwithstanding, not even the Yemenite rabbis who opposed the dardaim heeded this ostracism. Instead, they intermarried, sat together in batei midrash, and continued to sit with Rabbi Yiḥyeh Qafeh in beth din.

From this time Yemenite Jews may be classified as Shami, mainstream Baladi and Dor Dai or "Rambamist".  A term frequently used by Dor Daim for Yemenites who accept the Zohar is Iqq'shim (Hebrew: עקשים), i.e., "obscurantists".

An important later Yemenite authority was Rabbi Yiḥyah Qafiḥ's grandson, Rabbi Yosef Qafiḥ, who edited many important works by Maimonides and Saadia Gaon (see his published works) as well as issuing two new editions of the Baladi prayer book. Unlike his grandfather he avoided expressing any opinion on the Zohar, beyond saying that it was preferable to draw one's spiritual sustenance from the works of Maimonides. There is therefore some doubt about whether Rabbi Qafiḥ junior should be regarded as a Dor Dai or as a mainstream Baladi. His intention was probably to reconcile the two groups, in the same way as the Maharitz tried to reconcile traditionalists and Kabbalists.

Dor Daim today
There is no official Dor Dai organization; thus they are hard to identify. Many individuals are reluctant to identify themselves by that name for fear of persecution. Some of the original Dor Dai synagogues in Israel survive, but have moved nearer to the mainstream Baladi tradition in the same way as Rabbi Yosef Qafiḥ. Similarly, there is no universally recognized leader for the movement. The successor of Rabbi Yosef Qafiḥ as leader of the Yemenite community as a whole is generally considered to be Rabbi Ratzon Arusi of Qiryat Ono.

Today's adherents have great respect for the Yemenite tradition in general, but they are not exclusively Yemenite in origin and may describe themselves as "talmide ha-Rambam" (disciples of Maimonides) rather than as "Dor Daim."  In 2005, there was a widely publicized gathering of hilltop settlers of Yemenite descent describing themselves as "Dor Daim", but it is unclear how far these represent the historic Dor Dai movement.

Beliefs

Theology
Dor Daim place particular importance on the Jewish doctrine of the absolute unity of God, which they believe has been compromised by the popular forms of Kabbalah prevalent today. In support of this, they appeal to the philosophical writings of various Geonim and Rishonim such as Saadia Gaon, Rabbenu Bahya ibn Paquda, Rabbi Yehuda Halevi and Maimonides. The following points concerning the Almighty's Unity are in particular emphasized both by Dor Daim and talmide ha-Rambam:

Note: None of these is controversial, as mainstream Judaism has substantially the same beliefs.

 He is Incomparable to any created thing
 He is neither male nor female, but due to the limitations of human speech we must use certain terms allegorically and metaphorically to some extent in order to convey the fact that He does exist
 His existence is qualitatively different from all other existences, and all other existences depend upon Him and are sustained by Him, while He remains infinitely and unfathomably distinct and independent from all creation
 He is one unity unlike any unity in creation; His Oneness is not a unity which can be divided or which is composed of parts, both of which could only be the case with a unity that is subject to time/space; Nor is His Oneness a one in the sense of a species or type.
 No quality of creation applies to Him: not space, not time, not change, no concept of a body, form, or image, no concept of filling a body, form, or any location, nor any other factor of creation - for He is Perfect and Sufficient in Himself and has no need for any of these.  He is not a force or a power which possess or fills something else, nor is there any aspect of multiplicity in Him - as would be the case were the world literally to be within Him.  Any Biblical or Talmudic phrases which seem to imply that any quality of creation applies to Him must be understood as having some meaning other than its literal meaning, for He transcends all aspects of creation.  None of them are applicable to Him.
 The Splendor of the Reality of His Being is so great that no mind can grasp even the smallest part of it, for He has no parts, as it says, "..and to His Greatness there is no investigating." (Psalms 145:3)  Therefore, one must always be aware that the sublime Truth of His Being transcends anything we can ever express, but that all references to Him are either by speaking of what He is not or by way of literary tools such as metaphor.

Attitude to Kabbalah

In the book Milhamoth HaShem, one finds that possibly the most fundamental issue the Dor Daim had (and have) with the popularly accepted understanding of Kabbalah concerns the absolute transcendent Singularity/Oneness of the Creator and the laws against avodah zarah (forbidden forms of devotion/idolatry). The Dor Daim believe that the popular forms of Kabbalah prevalent today are contrary to the absolute and incomparable Unity of the Creator and violate various laws against idolatry and polytheism, in particular the prohibition against Ribbuy Reshuyoth (worshipping or conceiving of a multiplicity of reigns) referred to by Maimonides in his Mishneh Torah.

The issue is not the existence of Kabbalah as such. The word "Kabbalah" is used in older Jewish sources and by Maimonides to simply mean "tradition" and need not refer to mysticism of any kind. Furthermore, Dor Daim accept that in Talmudic times there was a secret mystical tradition in Judaism, known as Maaseh Bereshith (the work of creation) and Maaseh Merkavah (the work of the chariot); Maimonides interprets these as respectively referring to something similar to Aristotelian physics and metaphysics as interpreted in the light of Torah. They simply reject the notion that this tradition is represented by the ideas popularly referred to as Kabbalah in our days.

Neither Dor Daim nor talmide ha-Rambam are against mysticism per se. Rabbi Yosef Qafiḥ, for example, published the ancient mystical text Sefer Yetzirah together with his translation of Saadia Gaon's commentary. Likewise, Bahya ibn Paquda and Abraham son of Maimonides (sometimes described as "Jewish Sufis") are especially respected among Dor Daim and talmide ha-Rambam.

In particular a Dor Dai is not bound to reject the theory of the ten Sefirot, as set out in the Sefer Yetzirah. In the Sefer Yetzirah, unlike in later Kabbalah, there is no question of the Sefirot being Divine entities or even attributes: they are simply the numerals, considered as the dimensional parameters used in the creation of the world.

What they view as the problem comes in with the Sefer ha-Bahir and the Zohar, where the Sefirot have become hypostatized as Divine attributes or emanations, and it seems that religious devotions can never be addressed directly to the En Sof (the Absolute) but only through one or other of the Sefirot; and in modern Edot ha-Mizrach prayer books each occurrence of the Divine Name is vocalized differently in a kind of code to show which Sefirah one should have in mind. This problem is compounded in the teachings of Isaac Luria as found in the writings of Ḥayim Vital, where it is held that as a result of some catastrophe in Heaven, the Sefirot vessels have fractured and their channels re-formed into a variously stated number of inter-relating personalised aspects within God's Manifestation known as Partzufim (from Greek πρόσωπα, faces), teaching that the purpose of each religious observance is to assist their unification. This is felt as being uncomfortably close to polytheism.

The original Dor Daim, such as Yiḥyah Qafiḥ, condemned the Zohar as an outright forgery and as filled with idolatry. Some of today's Dor Daim take a somewhat more moderate stance, allowing that the Zohar may contain elements of authentic Midrash together with a great deal of later interpolation, while considering the Zohar in its present form to be an unsafe guide, both to theology and to practice. Other segments of Orthodox Judaism which share this perspective of the Dor Daim, while not necessarily rejecting the Zohar itself, include most talmide ha-Rambam (disciples of Maimonides), as well as portions of the Modern Orthodox community and others. Those among these groups who do not reject the Zohar assert that the Kabbalah as popularly taught today represents a distortion of the Zohar's intended teachings. However, the specific issues identified by the Dor Daim remain in all current and older editions of the Zohar.

Heresy
A figure spoken of frequently in the esoteric works on Kabbalah, particularly in the Zohar, is what has come to be known as the "lesser countenance" (Aramaic: זעיר אנפין), or the Demiurge, which term and its usage is believed to have been of Gnostic church origin, although in later years was seen by the kabbalists as one of the angels in heaven associated with the emotive faculties of the soul and with the concept of "finite power." The same figure is also known in Latin writings as Microprosopus, derived from the Greek mikros small + prosopon face, and is said to have a father. Certain kabbalists allege that our prayers and our worship go unto the "lesser countenance", and that the world was created by him. To Rabbi Yehiya al-Qafih, such statements amounted to heresy, since there was none other but God who created the universe and unto whom, alone, we are to pray.

In a letter addressed to Rabbi Avraham Isaac Kook, the chief Rabbi of Mandate Palestine, Rabbi Yihya Qafih argues effectually that such beliefs stand in contradiction to the Law bequeathed to us by Moses. He levels harsh criticism against the Zohar for its endorsement of heretical teachings, such as that of the "lesser countenance" (Aramaic: זעיר אנפין), as well as against the new kabbalists who claim that "lesser countenance" is our God and we are his people, such as described by Sefer HaBrit (Article 20, item # 15) and by Yosher Levav (page 4),  and who allege wrongly that it was he who brought us out of the land of Egypt, and that his wife (who is Malkhut) was she who smote the Egyptians in Egypt and at the sea, while it was he who revealed himself unto Israel at Mount Sinai and gave to us his Divine Law  All these things, Rabbi Qafih alleged, should be expunged from our religion, since the import of the Torah is clear that only God, and God alone, had done all these things for Israel.

Reincarnation and Invocation of Saints

Another matter of dispute between Dor Daim and the Kabbalists concerns the Dor Daim's rejection of reincarnation. They support their rejection with writings of Saadia Gaon (892-942) who dismissed reincarnation as an unauthentic Jewish belief. This perspective is shared not only by non-Dor Dai disciples of Rambam (Maimonides) but also by many in mainstream Orthodox Judaism.

Dor Daim also disapprove of requesting from any unseen force other than the Almighty.  They are against soliciting angels or Jewish leaders who have died.  They disapprove of such practices regardless of one's location, and even if the individual desires that the angel or saint intercede with God. Dor Daim, indeed all Meqoriim, consider such practices absolutely antithetical to the most essential principles of what they believe to be historical Judaism:  to serve the One Incomparable Creator without joining partners or mediators together with Him in our prayers and worship. This is based on their understanding of the books mentioned above, and specifically on the laws concerning mediator (sarsur) or an advocate (melitz) mentioned in the Mishneh Torah and the fifth of the Thirteen Principles of Faith.  Prayer, in Judaism, is a form of worship: as the ancient sages of Israel are well known to have stated, "What is the service of the heart?  This is prayer."

In addition to the issue of invoking forces other than the Almighty, Dor Daim and Meqoriim in general disapprove of the common practice of visiting the graves, shrines, or monuments of saints, even if an individual does not request from a force other than the Almighty.  Basing themselves on Talmudic sources codified in the Mishneh Torah, they believe this to be a prohibition instituted by the Sages of the Great Court established under Moses - the Sanhedrin.  They generally consider this prohibition to have been instituted as a means to distance the people of Israel from the possibility of transgressing what Meqoriim consider to be the Biblical-prohibitions of establishing a "monument" (prohibited even without any connection to idolatry) and from invoking any force other than the Almighty.  This, they point out, is the very same reason Jewish tradition explains why Moses' burial place was left unknown according to the Biblical record.

Jewish law

Dor Daim disapprove of what they believe to be an abandonment of a number of Talmudic practices on the part of a large portion of the Jewish world in favor of newer customs and innovations, some of which, in their opinion, are even contrary to Talmudic law.  In particular this disapproval is aimed at customs derived from the Kabbalah, but it is not confined to them.  In their view, and still more in the view of the talmide ha-Rambam, there is simply no constitutional authority in Jewish law to institute new rules or practices, whether in the direction of leniency or of severity, since the demise of the Sanhedrin in 425 CE, or at the latest the closure of the Talmud, and the role of later rabbis is confined to teaching and codification of the law as it stood at that date.  They do not claim that this position is ideal, and would gladly see a revived Sanhedrin sort out the problems in Jewish law, provided that it was itself established in strict conformity to law.

In their view, the Mishneh Torah of Maimonides is the most accurate and therefore most authoritative statement of Talmudic law, and is in itself a sufficient reference without resort to any other source.  Maimonides writes that if the Mishneh Torah was intended to be explained by the Talmud he wouldn't have written the Mishneh Torah. Furthermore, the current text of the Talmud is fairly corrupt with numerous textual variants; from this, coupled with Maimonides' indications that he had far more accurate and complete Talmudic texts available to him, they conclude that the Mishneh Torah provides the best access to what the Talmud must originally have intended.

Unlike many of the later talmide ha-Rambam, the original Dor Daim were not committed to the view that all local custom, whether Sephardi or Ashkenazi or from any other source, is totally illegitimate to the extent that it differs from normative Jewish law (as best stated, in their view, by Maimonides), so they preserved certain non-Maimonidean Yemenite peculiarities in minor matters.  However they did believe, in reliance on old authorities such as Joseph Caro and David ibn abi Zimra, that the views of Maimonides ought to be authoritative not only in Yemen but also in Eretz Yisrael, Egypt and the Near East generally.

There is a link between the Dor Daim's stance on Jewish law and on the other issues, as one argument for accepting the Mishneh Torah as the best restatement of Jewish law is that most of the later codifiers, including Joseph Caro, were believers in Kabbalah and should therefore not be accepted as authorities. As against this, many (e.g. Yeshayahu Leibowitz) argue that Caro and the others were operating within the rigorous rules of halachic reasoning and that their conclusions were in no way affected or invalidated by their personal theological views (just as, from the opposite perspective, Maimonides' status as a halachic authority is not affected by his acceptance of Greek philosophy). The Dor Daim reply to this is that Caro specifically allows the Zohar as a (limited and subordinate) source of rulings in Jewish law, so that his code includes practices found in Kabbalistic texts without basis in Talmudic texts.

Practices

Those aspects of Jewish/Talmudic law which Dor Daim may emphasize, be particularly passionate about, and/or consider to have been cast aside by large portions of the Jewish world include:

 laws on 'avodah zarah' (forbidden forms of worship/idolatry) which they hold prohibits any use of intermediaries or mediators between oneself and the One Creator, prohibits praying or making requests to unseen forces such as past Rabbis or Sefirot, or supplicating to any unseen being other than the One Absolute Being - Y/H/W/H, and not doing any specific acts of religious devotion to any thing other than He;
 laws of legislation relating to the function and necessity of the Great Court (the Sanhedrin)
 laws concerning the settlement of the Land of Israel by the People of Israel as elaborated upon in Hilkhoth Melakhim u'Milhamotheham in the Mishneh Torah;
 certain laws concerning kashruth, such as Halita - immersing meat into boiling water before cooking;
 preservation of proper and exact pronunciation of all the Hebrew letters and Hebrew grammar (although there are minute differences even amongst the Dor Daim);
 emphasizing memorization of the Ḥumash (the Torah/Law of Moses); for example, each of the seven individuals called up to read from a Sefer Torah (Torah scroll) reads out loud the particular section of that week's parasha (section) upon which he said a blessing, as opposed to other customs in which there is a single, set reader. (This custom arose from there existing some people who did not know the cantillations by heart, and would be embarrassed to read in public);
 that unmarried females should also wear a head-covering, and not only married women.
 that one should strive to wear a Tallit Gadol and or Tefillin as much as permitted by Talmudic law whenever possible. In various areas of Israel, including Jerusalem, one may see individuals wearing the Tallit Gadol during 'Erev Shabbat' (Friday night) hanging over or wrapped over their shoulders in a manner distinct from the majority custom, when almost no other Jews would be wearing a Tallit Gadol.  Even children under 13 can be seen wearing a Tallit Gadol among them.

Dor Daim usually use Yosef Qafiḥ's edition of the Baladi prayer book.  This is on the lines of the prayer book of the Maharitz, and therefore contains some Kabbalistic insertions, enabling the book to be used by mainstream Baladi Jews.  However, these insertions are clearly marked by footnotes as being later additions.  Dor Daim can therefore use this prayer book and simply omit these additions.

Similarities and differences with other groups

Mainstream Baladi Jews

As previously explained, the Baladi/Shami distinction does not always coincide with the Dor Daim/Iqshim distinction.  That is, while a Dor Dai is necessarily a Baladi, and a Shami is necessarily an Iqshi (Kabbalist), most Baladim occupy an intermediate point on the spectrum and may or may not accord some validity to Kabbalah.

The distinguishing mark of a Baladi individual or community is the use of the traditional liturgy, regardless of the underlying theological or intellectual orientation.  Some Baladim may sympathize to a greater or lesser extent with the Dor Dai distrust of Zoharic and Lurianic Kabbalah.  Others may accept the Lurianic version of Kabbalah but retain the ancestral liturgy on the ground that, even according to Luria, this is the Kabbalistically correct thing to do.  Others again may have no particular views one way or the other.  However, Baladim of all shades uniformly accept the Mishneh Torah rather than the Shulchan Aruch as their authority on Jewish law.

Outwardly the practices of Baladi Jews and Dor Daim are almost identical, apart from some Kabbalistic insertions to be found in the Baladi prayer book.  However most Baladim, while holding that the Mishneh Torah is the best interpretation of Jewish law, are content to preserve it as the particular custom of their group and do not seek to delegitimize the customs of other Jewish communities. (How far the Dor Daim seek to do this is a matter of debate.)

Several of the above-listed distinctions between Dor Daim and the majority of world Jewry are shared by all traditional Baladi Yemenite Jews, and not just by Dor Daim.  On matters of law and practice as opposed to theology, the only difference between Dor Daim and the rest of Baladi Yemenite Jews appears to be the level of zeal in preserving the above listed practices, although exceptions do exist.

Talmide ha-Rambam

Dor Daim are regarded as part of a wider trend within Judaism known as talmide ha-Rambam (pupils of Maimonides), not necessarily confined to the Yemenite community.  It is important to note that although Dor Daim always identify with the Rambam's legal and theological perspectives on Judaism (hashkafa), Dor Daim and talmide ha-Rambam are not necessarily one and the same.  That is, a disciple of the Rambam may or may not be a Dor Dai; however, a Dor Dai will always be (in a broader sense) a disciple of the Rambam.

Today's talmide ha-Rambam differ from the original Dor Daim in two ways.

Talmide ha-Rambam do not necessarily reject the Zohar.  However, their interpretation may differ more or less drastically from the Lurianic school or the currents of thought popularly referred to as "Kabbalah" today.
Talmide ha-Rambam tend to hold that the Mishneh Torah is the best restatement of Talmudic law, and that every custom that diverges from it is logically inferior if not actually illegitimate.  On points not explicitly covered by Maimonides, such as the exact mode of prostration during prayers, there is considerable competition to unearth the most authentic mode from among the various Yemenite practices found in recorded history.  Dor Daim, by contrast, do retain some current Yemenite practices, even when (according to the talmide ha-Rambam) these diverge from the views of Maimonides (see under Jewish law above).  For example, they do not follow Maimonides' recommendation to eliminate all prayers prior to the Kaddish and Shema in order to avoid 'unnecessarily burdening the congregation'.

In short, talmide ha-Rambam are less extreme than Dor Daim about the Zohar and more extreme about "Maimonides-only" jurisprudence.  Nevertheless, the similarities between the two groups, as expressed in the list of beliefs and practices above, overwhelmingly outnumber the differences.

Many members of the small and slowly growing Dor Dai community claim a fear of persecution and therefore maintain an almost secret existence.  It is very likely that the entire movement of Dor Daim, together with some of their well-known leaders, has helped, and continues to help, fuel the rapidly growing community of talmide ha-Rambam.  It is undeniable that, while there are sometimes differences between Dor Daim and talmide ha-Rambam as a whole—over certain details of practical Jewish law and the issue of the Zohar—the two communities continue to have strong links.

As stated, talmide ha-Rambam differ from Dor Daim in that they are not confined to the Yemenite community and need not be committed to specifically Yemenite customs.  Nonetheless, Yemenite scholarship and practice are still a major resource for them.  Two good examples of this are seen in the works of Rabbi Yosef Qafiḥ and of Mechon-Mamre.org.  
Rabbi Yosef Qafiḥ has made various contributions to Dor Daim, talmide ha-Rambam and the Jewish world as a whole.  Examples of his contributions include his encyclopedic commentary to the entire Mishneh Torah set to the renowned Yemenite text of the Mishneh Torah, his translation of all of Maimonides' Commentary on the Mishnah from Arabic into modern Hebrew, as well as translations of the Guide for the Perplexed, Duties of the Heart, Sefer Kuzari, and a number of other works.
Mechon-Mamre.org has produced software for learning the Ḥumash, Tanakh, Mishnah, the Talmudic texts, as well as the Mishneh Torah according to Rabbi Qafiḥ and its own accurate and scholarly text, intended to be beneficial to all.  The Mechon-mamre.org website's "About" section  states that most participants in the work of Mechon-Mamre are Baladi Yemenite Jews, although some of the more impacting individuals of Mechon-Mamre.org are not Yemenite or Dor Daim at all, but merely promote observance of Talmudic law as codified in the Mishneh Torah.

Dor Daim and "Rambamists" are most easily recognized by the manner in which their Tzitzit are tied (according to the Rambam, despite slight variations in understanding). Temani/Rambam Tzitzit can be distinguished from those of the many 'knitted kippa' youths who have adopted the same style, but have added Tekhelet. Rambamists and Baladim are also noticeable by the fact that they wear their Tallit in a different manner from non-Yemenite Jews, and even wear it on Friday nights/Erev Shabbath, which is almost unheard of in non-Yemenite synagogues (apart from a handful of Hasidim in Jerusalem, referred to as Yerushalmis, who wear it very discreetly so as to not look arrogant).

Gaonists

Dor Daim as well as non-Yemenite or non-Dor Dai students of the Rambam all find a certain level of commonality with individuals who sometimes call themselves Gaonists. Gaonists aim at applying Jewish law in everyday life according to the writings of the Geonim as a whole without singling out any one particular Gaon or codification of Jewish law over another.  The commonality between all of these groups is sourced in their shared pursuit of living according to the original understanding of Talmudic law as much as possible with as little influence from the effects of almost 2,000 years of exile as possible.  These groups together are sometimes referred to as Meqoriim (originalists/followers of the originals).

Mitnaggedim and followers of the Vilna Gaon

The dispute between Dor Daim and Aqashim has some similarities to that between Mitnaggedim and Hasidim, with the Vilna Gaon and his heirs standing for Talmudic intellectualism and a Halachic worldview like Rabbi Yiḥyah Qafiḥ. However, mainstream Litvish Jews venerate the Zohar and Luria, and like the Hasidim their elite write Kabbalistic commentaries. Joseph Dan writes that there is no truth to the popular notion that the Mitnaggedim were more rationalist than the Hasidim; Lurianic notions dominate in the theologies of both camps. Their dispute can be seen as a battle within two conceptions of Lurianic kabbalah; the Mitnaggedim being faithful to received Kabbalah, while the Hasidim introduced new conceptions into theirs, particularly new conceptions of mystical leadership. On the whole, Mitnagdic-Litvish Judaism accepted Kabbalah, but had a distinctive "intellectualist" understanding of it.

Different interpretations of Luria arose among his followers regarding whether tzimtzum (withdrawal of Divinity from Creation) should be taken literally or metaphorically. Hasidism read it metaphorically and immanently, leading to Panentheism. Mitnaggedism read it transcendentally in relation to Man, leading to Theism, though allowing validity to Panentheism solely from the Divine perspective. Shneur Zalman of Liadi accused the Vilna Gaon of taking tzimtzum literally and not following Luria fully, though Mitnaggedic Kabbalists rejected this. It seems that the Vilna Gaon, who wrote extensive Kabbalistic works, followed the Lurianic system, but diverged from Luria when he felt the Zohar lent itself to another approach. The issue is the subject of forewords to the main texts of Lithuanian Kabbalah: the introduction, by  Rabbi Ḥayyim of Volozhin, to the Vilna Gaon's commentary to the Sifra di-Tsniuta and Rabbi Yitzchak Eizik Chaver's Pitchei Shearim.

Paradoxically, the Chabad philosophical school of Hasidic thought created by Shneur Zalman of Liadi, an offshoot movement of its own from Hasidic emotionalist faith, routinely embraced perspectives from Maimonidean and other medieval Jewish philosophy within its textual system. To an extent Shneur Zalman personally modelled himself after Maimonides, and his Tanya after the Guide of the Perplexed. The 7th Lubavitcher Rebbe likewise extolled Maimonides as a history shaping leader, and created a daily study program in Mishneh Torah. Chabad leaders read the human wisdom of Maimonides' Guide and the Divine wisdom of Lurianic Kabbalah as partial theological aspects of their inclusive essence mystical study of Divinity. In contrast the Vilna Gaon, a Kabbalist of a traditionalist type, had no use for philosophy, declaring he only learned 3 things from it. Haskalah attempts to claim him as one of their own were entirely misplaced. Although proficient in, and recommending the necessity for mathematics and sciences to understand the Talmud, and highly astute in lower textual critical emendation of Judaic texts, while revering Maimonides for his holiness and legal greatness, the Gaon berated Rambam for being "misled by the accursed philosophy" in rejecting demons, incantations and amulets. Both Hasidic and Mitnagdic Kabbalists entirely rejected the physical literalist interpretations of Kabbalah by Sabbatean movements as idolatrous. The Baal Shem Tov himself declared that esoteric study of Kabbalah symbolism outside his Hasidic inner soul holiness experiential psychologisation of it, by those not purified, was forbidden and lead to the Sabbatean false physical anthropomorphism of it by their impure desires, the cardinal conceptual sin in Kabbalistic understanding. He said this at a time and in the same vicinity where Frankism had taken Kabbalah into antinomian and nihilist desecration of Torah.

In his Nefesh HaHayyim, Chaim of Volozhin, founder of the Litvish Yeshiva movement and main theorist of Mitnaggedism, responds to the theology of Schneur Zalman's Tanya based on different interpretation of the same Kabbalistic sources. Their difference revolves around alternate identifications between Divine Immanence/Transcendence and Divine Monism/Pluralism. For Hayyim Volozhin and Mitnaggedic-Litvish Judaism: Man relates to transcendent Theism intellectually through Talmud and Halacha, rather than to immanent Panentheism through Hasidic devekut. Kabbalah is reserved for the elite, rather than popularised in Hasidism. Elite Mitnaggedic prayer uses Kabbalistic worldview to relate to the ultimate non-existence of Creation from the Divine perspective. For the mainstream, spirituality is through Talmudic study and Halachic worldview for its own sake.

Regarding Jewish Law, those of the Vilna Gaon's successors who were associated with the Volozhin yeshiva, such as the Brisker group and in particular Rabbi Chaim Soloveitchik, had a very high regard for the Mishneh Torah and held it as the best tool for the theoretical understanding of the Talmud and of Jewish law generally.  When however it came to practical legal rulings, an activity of which they steered clear when possible, they adhered to the normative Ashkenazi version of Halakha, as set out in the Shulchan Aruch and the glosses of Moses Isserles.

There are various groups in Israel today which claim to follow the Vilna Gaon. These may be found in places as diverse as the Neturei Karta and the fringes of Religious Zionism, the latter group being represented by the Aderet Eliyahu yeshiva. Their intellectualist orientation has some similarities to that of the Dor Daim, though also venerating Kabbalah.

Some thinkers of a Modern Orthodox mitnagged cast of thought, however, such as Yeshayahu Leibowitz, reject Zoharic Kabbalah and praise the work of Rabbi Yiḥyah Qafiḥ.

Spanish and Portuguese Jews

Dor Daim and other Yemenite talmide ha-Rambam like to compare themselves to the Spanish and Portuguese Jews, and think of them as "the other Rambam Jews".  This is largely because of their shared scepticism about the Zohar.  The resemblance has however been exaggerated.

Spanish and Portuguese Jews preserve an early form of the Sephardic liturgy from before the expulsion from Spain, which reflected some, but only very limited, influence from the Kabbalah and the Zohar.  In the 16th and early 17th centuries they adopted a certain number of Lurianic observances in a piecemeal fashion, for example the Tu Bishvat seder.  After the Sabbatai Zevi debacle these observances were largely dropped, because it was felt that Lurianic Kabbalah had contributed to the disaster.  The arguments against the authenticity of the Zohar advanced by Jacob Emden and Leone di Modena were also influential.  At the present day the general Spanish and Portuguese attitude to the Kabbalah is one of indifference rather than hostility. As Spanish and Portuguese communities act as hosts for Sephardi Jews of many other backgrounds, there would be no bar on individuals regarding Kabbalah more positively.  In particular, the Lurianic Kabbalah had a following in the Jewish community of Livorno, which falls within the Spanish and Portuguese group but was the main point of contact between it and the Levantine Sephardim.  The Spanish and Portuguese group's closest resemblance would therefore be not to Dor Daim but to mainstream Baladi Yemenites.

Spanish and Portuguese Jews admire Maimonides and identify with the Golden age of Jewish culture in Spain.  However, they cannot be classified as "Rambamists" in the sense required, as their religious law is based squarely on the Bet Yosef of Joseph Caro, subject to certain liturgical customs peculiar to themselves.  It could even be argued that they follow Caro more closely than any other group, as many other Sephardim, especially the eastern communities influenced by the Ben Ish Chai, regard Isaac Luria as having equal or even greater authority than Caro.

The above describes the attitude of traditional communities such as London and Amsterdam.  In some newer communities, in particular among the followers of José Faur and Yaakov Oliveira, a more purist and principled attitude has evolved, which does place considerable emphasis on the Mishneh Torah; however they also utilize the Shulchan Aruch in their lectures in order to help promote the study of practical Jewish law amongst the greater Jewish community.

Criticisms

1. There are those who would claim that Dor Daim and even all students of the Rambam are heretics by reason of their non-acceptance of Zohar and Lurianic Kabbalah.  This claim depends on the assumption that the Lurianic Kabbalah is a dogma of Judaism binding upon all Jews.  Not only the Dor Daim and talmide ha-Rambam, but many other Orthodox groups, such as the followers of the Vilna Gaon along with many of the non-Hasidic Orthodox, would disagree with this assumption, regardless of whether or not they personally accept the Lurianic Kabbalah. Such a view, according to Rabbi Ovadia Yosef, does not make the Dor Daim  heretics. Moreover, Rabbis Eliyahu Dessler and Gedaliah Nadel maintained that it is acceptable to believe that the Zohar was not written by Rabbi Shimon bar Yochai and that it had a late authorship. Already over 200 years ago the Noda Bihudah, in his sefer Derushei HaTzlach, argued that the Zohar is to be considered unreliable as it came into our hands many hundreds of years after Rashbi's death and in the absence of an unbroken mesorah, among other reasons.

The Dor Dai response is that whether a person or school is heretical is a question of law, to be decided according to authoritative works of halakha: one is not a heretic simply for disagreeing with a widely held aggadic interpretation, unless the halakha specifically says so.  The Mishneh Torah is comprehensive in scope and is, at the very least, one of the authoritative sources of halakha, so to follow it must be an acceptable way of doing Judaism.  Accordingly, since the Dor Daim assert nothing that is not found within the four corners of the Mishneh Torah, and the Mishneh Torah cannot be interpreted as actually requiring belief in anything approaching Zoharic or Lurianic Kabbalah, they cannot be heretics - unless the Mishneh Torah itself is heretical, which is not held by any mainstream Jewish group.2. Others believe that the main problem is not that Dor Daim do not follow Kabbalah for themselves, but that they delegitimize those who do follow it.  Rabbi Yiḥyah Qafiḥ, for instance, held that one must not use parchments written by, or eat meat slaughtered by, believers in Kabbalah because these are dedicated to Zeir Anpin (one of the partzufim of the 10 sephirot), a concept apparently distinct from the Unfathomable Almighty Creator.

Few Dor Daim take such an extreme view today, as most consider that the above reasoning makes Jewish law too uncertain in practice.  Those who do take such a view would argue that it is not at all uncommon in Judaism for one group to treat as invalid the ritual acts or objects of another for technical or doctrinal reasons.  That does not amount to an attempt to exclude the other group from Judaism.

3. A third criticism is that Dor Daim take works of Kabbalah too literally: it is intended to be myth and metaphor, and to subject it to rigorous analysis as the Dor Daim do is like trying to construe a work of poetry as if it were a statute.  Works of Kabbalah themselves contain warnings that the teachings should not be exposed to common view or read too realistically, and that to do so is indeed to incur the danger of falling into heresy or idolatry.

The Dor Dai response to this is that, however this may be in theory, these warnings have not been observed.  Kabbalah, in its most literal and "realistic" sense, has in fact been extensively popularised, with the result that many otherwise pious Jewish groups are now permeated with superstition, so that the whole enterprise is now more trouble than it is worth.  Further, the claim that these works, on their true interpretation, are harmless metaphorical imagery fully compatible with monotheism is disingenuous: the origins of most Kabbalistic concepts in pagan systems such as Neoplatonism and Gnosticism are too glaringly obvious to be ignored. (Dor Daim do not claim that Kabbalists are in fact polytheists: only that they are inconsistent.)

4. A fourth criticism is that it is a stultification of Jewish law to regard any authority, even one as eminent as Maimonides, as final.  The essence of Oral Law is that it is case law rather than code law, and needs to be interpreted in each generation: otherwise the Mishneh Torah could simply have been handed down as part of the written Torah.  For this reason, it is a principle of Jewish law that "Jephthah in his generation is as Samuel in his generation": one is bound by the current authorities, rather than by previous authorities however objectively superior.

The Dor Dai response to this is that the acceptance of Maimonides in the Yemenite community has always been regarded as a legitimate version of Jewish law, and that they are no more stultified by the authority of Maimonides than other Jewish communities are by the authority of the Shulchan Aruch. From the practical point of view Jewish law as codified by Maimonides is as compatible with modern conditions as any later code: if anything more so, as later Jewish law has become enmeshed in many unnecessary intellectual tangles.  If there are practical problems caused by this "static" view of Jewish law, that is part of the price of exile: the question is not whether a given reform would be desirable, but whether there is constitutional authority to make it, and in their view there is not.

5. A final criticism is that the Dor Dai version of Judaism is disquietingly reminiscent of militant Islamic trends such as Salafism.  Both started out as modernising movements designed to remove some of the cobwebs and allow the religion to compete in the modern world, and both have ended up as fundamentalist groups lending themselves to alliances with political extremism. Both disapprove of mysticism (Kabbalah or Sufism) and praying at tombs; both tend to dismiss more moderate coreligionists as unbelievers (see Takfir); both cut out centuries of sophisticated legal scholarship in favour of an every-man-for-himself "back to the sources" approach.

The Dor Daim answer to this is:
Political militancy is no more characteristic of Dor Daim than of many Kabbalistically-inspired branches of Religious Zionism (e.g. the followers of Zvi Yehuda Kook).  In fact the conditions for political or military action, as laid down in the Mishneh Torah, are extremely strict and limited.
Neither Dor Daim nor talmide ha-Rambam are against mysticism per se: see Attitude to Kabbalah above. The attitude to Kabbalah is based on much more specific factors: if there is an analogue to their opposition among other religions, it is essentially an opposition to the espousal of concepts such as incarnation, pantheism, and panentheism - apart from the opposition to idolatry in general, as understood in the context of the Mishneh Torah.
The antagonism shared by Dor Daim and talmide ha-Rambam against praying at tombs etc. is distinct from the Salafi view in a number of ways.  First, in contrast to the Salafi view, the Dor Dai / talmide ha-Rambam view is that this prohibition is Rabbinic, meaning that it is not a direct command from the Almighty, but rather it is a "fence" to distance a Jew from the possibility of transgressing a more severe prohibition.  They do not consider praying at or visiting a tomb to be idolatry, nor do they believe that this is prohibited to all people (i.e. non-Israelites), whereas the Salafi view is that this is forbidden to everyone as a very severe prohibition in itself.
It is wrong to accuse Dor Daim and talmide ha-Rambam of being extremists, or of dismissing more moderate coreligionists as unbelievers: see reply to 2 above.  On the contrary, they often find more in common theologically with sectors of Modern Orthodoxy than they do with much of the Ḥasidic or Ḥaredi communities.
The method of learning and religious observance aimed at by them is firmly rooted in Jewish rabbinic authority (see Jewish law above), and is about as far from  an "every-man-for-himself" approach as it is possible to get.  How far a similar accusation may be true of Salafism (which is itself an umbrella description for a great many trends) is an independent question, on which Dor Daim are not required to express a view.
Salafis typically reject Islamic philosophy of the kind propounded by Avicenna and Averroes. Dor Daim, by contrast, find strong inspiration in the closely related Jewish philosophies of Bahya ibn Pakuda and Maimonides.
Many Dor Daim and talmide ha-Rambam desire that the Jewish people as a nation will return to upholding the Almighty's Torah with the establishment of a central religious authority - a Great Court (Sanhedrin) reestablished according to Jewish law as only fully codified in the Mishneh Torah.  That is one form of the Messianic aspiration implicit in any form of Orthodox Judaism.  It cannot be compared to the desire of some Islamists to reestablish a Khilafah by violent means if necessary.

See also
Dor Daim and Iqshim
Yihya Qafih
Yihya Yitzhak Halevi
Yosef Qafih
Hayyim Habshush
Thirteen Principles of Faith
Mishneh Torah

References

External links
Milḥamot Hashem Text by Yiḥyah Qafiḥ. HebrewEmunat Hashem Reply to Milḥamot Hashem by pro-Zohar Jerusalem rabbis. HebrewMechon-Mamre.org  The Mamre Institute, by one particular group of students of the Rambam; includes an especially accurate text of the Mishneh Torah, as well as all of the Tanakh, Mishnah, and other Talmudic texts.
 Maimonides Agonist: Disenchantment and Reenchantment in Modern Judaism Article by Menachem Kellner contrasting Maimonidean with Zoharic Judaism.
"The 14 Fundamental Principles of our "RMb"M" Torah Tradition" Summary of beliefs of talmide ha-RambamMachon Mishnat HaRambam Rabbi Ratzon Arusi's Machon Mishnat haRambam (Maimonides Institute) website. Rabbi Ratzon Arusi is chief rabbi of the Israeli town of Qiryat Ono as well as head of the Israeli Rabbinate's department of marriage.  HebrewChayas.com Information about Torath Moshe (Judaism) in general, but specifically students of the Rambam, Baladim, and Dor Daim.
Anti-Maimonidean Demons Article by José Faur on the Maimonist/Anti-Maimonist controversy
 Biblical Monotheism contains information on Noahide Laws and reflective of philosophical beliefs in common with Dor Daim and talmide ha-Rambam''
Believing is Knowing A blog by a student of the Rambam which expresses sympathy towards the more common practices of Ashkenazi Jews

Yemenite Jews
Jews and Judaism in Yemen
Jewish religious movements
Kabbalah
Schisms
Schisms in Judaism
Jewish belief and doctrine
Jewish apologetics